S (에스) is a South Korean project group consisting of three members: Kangta, Lee Ji-hoon and Shin Hye-sung. The group debuted in 2003, under the SM Entertainment label. After 11 years, they released and promoted another mini-album in 2014.

History
In 2003, S released their first album Fr.In.Cl, which stands for Friends in Classic. In 2014, after more than a decade in hiatus, the group released their second mini-album Autumn Breeze on October 27. As member Kangta wrote and produced the songs, it was said that his "unique music style and the trio’s harmonious voices will create beautiful ballads". On October 18, the group performed their title track "Without You (하고 싶은 거 다)" for the first time at SM Entertainment's agency-wide concert SM Town in Shanghai. The music video for the song was released on October 24, starring Kwon Yuri of Girls' Generation.  The group continued to promote the song on various South Korean music programs, such as on Immortal Songs 2 on November 3.

Band members
Kangta
Shin Hye-sung
Lee Ji-hoon

Discography

Studio albums

EP

Concert tours

SMTown
 2014: SM Town Live World Tour IV

Awards and nominations

References

South Korean boy bands
South Korean contemporary R&B musical groups
South Korean musical trios
Musical groups established in 2003
Musical groups disestablished in 2014
Kangta